Bowell is an English and Irish surname of Norman origin. Notable people with the surname include:

 Edward L. G. Bowell (born 1943), American astronomer
 George Bennett Bowell (1875–1942), British horologist
 Horace Alexander William Bowell (1880–1957), English cricketer
 Mackenzie Bowell (1823–1917), Canadian prime minister
 Norman Bowell (1904–1943), English cricketer

See also
 Bowell, Alberta
 Bowel

Surnames of English origin
Surnames of Irish origin
Surnames of Norman origin